Orania corallina is a species of sea snail, a marine gastropod mollusk in the family Muricidae, the murex snails or rock snails.

Description

Distribution
The length of the shell attains 14 mm.

Geospatial Information

Country: Philippines

Precise Location: Cebu Is.(North Coast), Bohol Strait

Ref: [MUSEUMS VICTORIA COLLECTIONS] 

This marine species occurs also in the Persian Gulf and off South Africa and Madagascar; probably throughout the Indian Ocean. In the Pacific in New Caledonia, the Solomon Islands and the Philippines; also Malaysia and Indonesia, living usually at depths less than 100 m.

References

 Bozzetti L. (2018). Muricopsis hubrechti (Gastropoda: Muricidae: Muricopsinae). A new species from south-eastern Madagascar. Malacologia Mostra Mondiale. 100: 4-6.
 Houart, R. (2020). The Orania fischeriana complex in the Indo-West Pacific and description of a new Cytharomorula species (Gastropoda, Muricidae, Ergalataxinae) from Hawaii. Novapex. 21 (4): 97-106.
 Houart, R.; Kilburn, R. N. & Marais, A. P. (2010). Muricidae. pp. 176-270, in: Marais A.P. & Seccombe A.D. (eds), Identification guide to the seashells of South Africa. Volume 1. Groenkloof: Centre for Molluscan Studies. 376 pp.

External links
 Melvill, J. C. & Standen, R. (1903). Descriptions of sixty-eight new Gastropoda from the Persian Gulf, Gulf of Oman, and North Arabian Sea, dredged by the Indo-European Telegraph Service, 1901–1903. Annals and Magazine of Natural History. (7) 12: 289-324

Gastropods described in 1903
Orania (gastropod)